The Papua New Guinea FA Cup, also known for sponsorship reasons as Besta Cup, is the top association football knockout cup tournament of Papua New Guinea, organized by the Papua New Guinea Football Association since 1988.

Winners

*Finschhafen won the 2006 cup, but unknown it was in extra time or a penalty shootout. 

**Morobe won the 2019 cup on penalties, but the result is unknown.

References

Football competitions in Papua New Guinea
National association football cups